Minna Rosita Nystedt (born 11 October 1967) is a Norwegian speed skater, born in Levanger. She competed at the 1988 Winter Olympics in Calgary.

She won four Norwegian single distance championships, and placed second in the all-round national championships in 1987, 1988, 1990 and 1992.

References

External links 
 

1967 births
Living people
People from Levanger
Norwegian female speed skaters
Olympic speed skaters of Norway
Speed skaters at the 1988 Winter Olympics
Sportspeople from Trøndelag